Environmental issues in Venezuela include natural factors such as earthquakes, floods, rockslides, mudslides, and periodic droughts. 

Venezuela ranks among the world's most ecologically diverse countries. However, it has suffered great environmental degradation. It has the third-highest deforestation rate in South America The Guri Dam, one of the world's largest, flooded a massive forested area and is now being filled with silt deposited by runoff from deforested areas. Environmental issues include sewage pollution into Valencia Lake, oil and urban pollution of Maracaibo Lake, deforestation, soil degradation, and urban and industrial pollution, especially along the Caribbean coast. Current concerns also include irresponsible mining operations that endanger the rain-forest ecosystem and indigenous peoples. Successive governments have attempted to develop environmental regulations. However, only 35 to 40 percent of Venezuela's land is regulated thus far, 29 percent as part of national parks.

Venezuela has ratified 14 international conventions regarding environmental protection and sustainable development, while also taking forward-looking steps internally to protect and preserve the country's natural wealth. Venezuela has 43 national parks and 36 natural monuments, and is the country in Latin America with the largest proportion of protected lands, with over 55 percent of its total territory. (Parks and monuments are only 17 percent of that total; the remaining protected areas are outside those parks and monuments.) The nation was ranked second in South America and ninth in the world on the Happy Planet Index of 2012, with a score of 56.9.

Water pollution

Zulia-Falcón area 

Countless sewage systems with not only human waste but also chemicals pour into the sea all along the coast.

Eastern Venezuela 
Several recent oil spills have led to water pollution. In February 2012 a PDVSA pipeline ruptured next to the Guarapiche River and fouled it for many days. The technicians in charge refused to close down the pumping because they did not want to stop the process, and this led to massive pollution of the area. A dam providing water to Maturín was said to be polluted, even though the national government denied this. This has led to a rupture between the national government and the Monagas governor.

Valencia Lake and Valencia Basin 

The Valencia Lake, formerly praised by Alexander von Humboldt for its beauty, is massively polluted due to the countless sewage systems pouring residuals.

Pollution levels in the whole Carabobo area have increased over the years. After the Carabobo governor denounced tap water as no longer drinkable, Hugo Chávez said that was part of an agenda of fear and what the opposition governor said was "nearly criminal".

The city of Valencia, Los Guayos, Guacara and many other locations get their water supply from the Pao-Cachinche dam to the south of Valencia. At the same time, this dam gets about 80% of the sewage systems from Valencia. The installations for water treatment, the responsibility of the national government centre Hidrocentro, are in disrepair. In 2007 the national government decided to pump water from the Valencia Lake – water unfit for human consumption – to the Pao-Cachinche dam. It installed a pumping plant in Los Guayos to do this.

Forests 
Venezuela had a 2018 Forest Landscape Integrity Index mean score of 8.78/10, ranking it 19th globally out of 172 countries.

See also 
 El Palito oil spill
 Orinoco Mining Arc

References 

Issues
Venezuela
Social issues in Venezuela